Frayssinous is a French surname. Notable people with the surname include:

Laurent Frayssinous (born 1977), French rugby league footballer and coach
Denis-Luc Frayssinous (1765–1841), French prelate and statesman, orator, and writer

French-language surnames